The grayish baywing (Agelaioides badius), formerly known as the bay-winged cowbird, is a species of bird in the family Icteridae. It is currently placed in the genus Agelaioides  but has traditionally been placed in the genus Molothrus. It is found in the northern half of Argentina, Bolivia, Uruguay, Paraguay and southern and central Brazil, The isolated population in north-eastern Brazil is usually now considered a separate species, the pale cowbird or pale baywing (Agelaioides fringillarius). The greyish baywing has been recorded as a vagrant in Chile.

Description and behavior
It has a total length of approximately 18 cm (7 in). It is overall ashy-brown with contrasting black lores and rufous wings. The taxon fringillarius has more black in the face and is overall more rufescent (less ashy).

It is social and commonly seen in small groups. Unlike the "true" cowbirds in the genus Molothrus, this species is not a brood parasite. In contrast, the screaming cowbird is a brood parasite of the grayish baywing, and while adult screaming cowbirds are overall blackish, juvenile screaming cowbirds closely resemble grayish baywings.

Habitat and status
It is found in a wide range of semi-open habitats, including scrub and light woodland. It is generally fairly common, and consequently considered to be of least concern by BirdLife International and IUCN.

References

 Ridgely, R. S.; & Tudor, G. (1989). The Birds of South America vol. 1 - The Oscine Passerines. Oxford University Press.

External links
Greyish baywing Agelaioides badius - Fauna Paraguay

grayish baywing
Birds of Argentina
Birds of Bolivia
Birds of Brazil
Birds of Paraguay
Birds of Uruguay
grayish baywing
grayish baywing
Taxonomy articles created by Polbot